Denver is a hamlet in Delaware County, New York, United States. Denver has a post office with ZIP code 12421.

References

Hamlets in Delaware County, New York
Hamlets in New York (state)